Martin Steven Briley (born 1950) is an English singer-songwriter, guitarist and keyboardist. He was born in London and has recorded with and written for a variety of well-known musicians, as well as releasing several solo albums.

Music career

Beginnings and early bands
Briley began playing and writing music when he was ten years old.  Arthur Brown was his events teacher.

At the age of seventeen, Briley and his band "Mandrake Paddle Steamer" (later shortened to Mandrake) signed their first record deal with Parlophone/EMI, and subsequently recorded at the legendary Abbey Road Studios. However, the group's published output during their lifetime was limited to two singles, one of which was released only in Sweden.

Briley was later signed to George Martin's AIR group of companies and went on to become an important part of the London studio scene as an arranger, vocalist and sought-after session guitarist. He also had a brief stint as bassist/guitarist of the British progressive rock band Greenslade, touring with the group and playing on their 1975 album Time and Tide. During live performances with the group he played a double-neck combination bass and guitar.

Session work in America
Briley moved to New York, where he found work as a touring and session musician for numerous artists, including Meat Loaf, Julian Lennon, Bonnie Tyler, the Modern Jazz Quartet, Engelbert Humperdinck, Lulu, Mick Jones, Donna Summer, Cliff Richard, Olivia Newton-John, The Hollies, Tom Jones and Albert Hammond.

Solo work
Briley signed a deal with Mercury Records as a solo artist in the early 1980s, going on to release three albums under his own name.  His single "The Salt in My Tears" went into heavy rotation on MTV and reached No. 36 on the Hot 100 on 30 July 1983, earning him a reputation as a one-hit wonder, as a follow-up single, "Put Your Hands on the Screen" did not crack the Hot 100.

Songwriting
Briley has received orchestral commissions, and has written songs for such artists as Céline Dion, *NSYNC, Dream, Michael Bolton, Mietta, Kenny Loggins, Pat Benatar, Jessica Andrews, Five Star, Jeff Healey, Rebecca St. James, Nana Mouskouri, Willie Nile, Gregg Allman, Night Ranger, David Hasselhoff, Patrick Swayze, Michael Monroe, Chastity Bono, Peter Tork, Nikki Webster, Hope Partlow, Natascha Sohl, Ballas Hough, Phil Stacey, Orianthi, The Maine and Barry Manilow.

Personal life
Briley lives in New York City with his wife, Dana Calitri, and has two daughters, Vanessa and Olivia.

Discography

 Fear of the Unknown (1981)
 One Night with a Stranger (1983) ( includes the hit single "The Salt in My Tears" )
 Dangerous Moments (1984)
 The Mercury Years (2005)
 It Comes in Waves (2006)
 Iceberg Shrinking (2011)

References

External links
Martin Briley's official website

English male singers
English songwriters
English rock singers
English male guitarists
English pianists
English session musicians
Living people
Singers from London
1950 births
Greenslade members
British male pianists
21st-century pianists
21st-century British male musicians
British male songwriters